This is a list of earthquakes in Afghanistan. Fairly moderate earthquakes have been very destructive in the county, particularly in the years 1998, 2002 and 2022. This can be blamed on the population residing in mostly informal and adobe houses, which are extremely vulnerable to earthquake shaking.

Tectonic setting
Afghanistan is situated near the southern extent of the Eurasian Plate.

Earthquakes

See also
Geology of Afghanistan

References

Sources

Further reading

Afghanistan
 
Earthquakes